Middle East Policy is an academic peer-reviewed journal on the Middle East region in the field of foreign policy founded in 1982, published quarterly by Wiley-Blackwell on behalf of the Middle East Policy Council. Its current editor is Anne Joyce, Vice President of MEPC.

The journal was previously published by Blackwell Publishing before it was acquired by John Wiley & Sons.

Contributors
Ann Elizabeth Mayer, Lenni Brenner, Sara Roy and W. Patrick Lang are notable contributors of the journal.

External links
Middle East Policy @ Middle East Policy Council
Middle East Policy @ John Wiley & Sons
International relations journals
Political science journals
Publications established in 1982
Wiley-Blackwell academic journals
Middle Eastern studies journals
Quarterly journals
Hybrid open access journals
1982 establishments in Washington, D.C.
Magazines published in Washington, D.C.